Paul Rykens, also known as Paul Rijkens, (14 September 1888 - 19 April 1965) was a Dutch businessman. He served as the founding chairman of Unilever. He was a founding member of the Bilderberg Group.

References

1888 births
1965 deaths
Businesspeople from Rotterdam
Chairmen of Unilever
20th-century Dutch businesspeople